The November 2007 San Francisco general elections were held on November 6, 2007 in San Francisco, California. The elections included those for San Francisco mayor, district attorney, and sheriff, and eleven San Francisco ballot measures.

Mayor

District attorney 
One-term incumbent and eventual Vice President Kamala Harris won reelection for a second term.

Sheriff 
Seven-term incumbent Michael Hennessey won reelection.

Propositions 

Note: "City" refers to the San Francisco municipal government.

Proposition A 

Proposition A would give the San Francisco Municipal Transportation Agency (SFMTA) more authority and funding while requiring the SFMTA to create a Climate Action Plan, and forbidding the increase the maximum number of parking spaces for new private development projects except with supermajority approval of the San Francisco Board of Supervisors.

Proposition B 

Proposition B would prohibit City-chartered board and committee members from serving as holdovers 60 days after their terms expire.

Proposition C 

Proposition C would require all measures sponsored by the Mayor and Board of Supervisors to be submitted for a public hearing before the Board of Supervisors.

Proposition D 

Proposition D would renew the Library Preservation Fund and allow the Fund to be used to improve and maintain library facilities.

Proposition E 

Proposition E would require the Mayor to appear before the Board of Supervisors monthly for formal policy discussions.

Proposition F 

Proposition F would allow the Board of Supervisors to permit airport police officers who served before December 27, 1997, to switch from the California Public Employees' Retirement System (CalPERS) to the San Francisco Employee Retirement System.

Proposition G 

Proposition G would establish the Golden Gate Park Stables Matching Fund for the purpose of renovating, repairing, and maintaining the horse stables at Golden Gate Park.

Proposition H 

Proposition H would increase the number of parking spaces developers can build and ease restrictions on building new parking spaces for buildings.

Proposition I 

Proposition I would establish the Office for Small Business as a City department and require it to operate a Small Business Assistance Center to provide information to small businesses.

Proposition J 

Proposition J would make it City policy to offer free Wi-Fi throughout San Francisco via contract with a private provider.

Proposition K 

Proposition K would make it City policy that the City would not increase the amount of general advertising signs on street furniture and City-owned buildings.

External links
 San Francisco Department of Elections

San Francisco
2007
Elections
San Francisco
2000s in San Francisco
2007